Caged Heat, also known as Renegade Girls, is a 1974 women in prison film. It was written and directed by Jonathan Demme (in his directorial debut) for New World Pictures, headed by Roger Corman. The film stars Juanita Brown, Roberta Collins, Erica Gavin, Ella Reid, Rainbeaux Smith, and Barbara Steele.

John Cale wrote and performed its soundtrack music, which features the guitar playing of Mike Bloomfield.

Two later films, Caged Heat II: Stripped of Freedom (1994) and Caged Heat 3000 (1995), made use of the Caged Heat name and the women-in-prison situation, but are unrelated to the original film.

Plot
Jacqueline Wilson (Erica Gavin) is convicted for illegal drug offenses and sentenced to a women's prison. She and several fellow convicts fight the repressive policies of the prison warden (Barbara Steele).

Cast
 Erica Gavin as Jacqueline Wilson 
 Juanita Brown as Maggie 
 Roberta Collins as Belle Tyson 
 Ella Reid as Pandora 
 Cheryl Smith as Lavelle (as Rainbeaux Smith) 
 Warren Miller as Dr. Randolph 
 Barbara Steele as Superintendent McQueen 
 Crystin Sinclaire as Alice 'Crazy Alice' (as Lynda Gold) 
 Mickey Fox as Bernice 
 Toby Carr Rafelson as Pinter (as Tobi Carr Refelson) 
 Ann Stockdale as Bonnie 
 Irene Stokes as Hazel

Production
Demme had produced two films for Corman, including the women in prison picture The Hot Box (1972). He wanted to become a director, and wrote a script for Corman, but the producer did not want to fund it, as he thought the cycle had peaked. Demme succeeded in raising the finance on his own and Corman agreed to distribute it through New World Pictures.

Originally titled Renegade Girls, the final title is most likely a reference to two earlier prison-themed movies, Caged and White Heat, both of which Jonathan Demme discussed paying homage in his DVD commentary to Caged Heat.

Critical reception
The film was Jonathan Demme's debut as a film director. Producer Roger Corman thought that the content of his company's previous "women in prison" films was inadequate, so he instructed Demme to create a screenplay that would bring something novel to this genre. However, Corman also wanted Caged Heat to retain most of the violence and nudity that audiences for this genre had come to expect.

Demme introduced new aspects to Caged Heat, including a satirical approach and making the sadistic warden female instead of male. To a lesser degree, Demme also incorporated elements of liberal politics, feminism, and social consciousness into his screenplay. Because of all these new elements introduced to the "women-in-prison" genre, and because of the film's status as Demme's first feature, some movie critics consider it to be more interesting than the average run-of-the-mill women-in-prison exploitation movie.

Further reading
 Bliss, Michael, and Banks, Christina: What Goes Around Comes Around: The Films of Jonathan Demme (1996):

See also
 List of American films of 1974

References

External links
 
 
 

1974 films
1970s crime drama films
American crime drama films
Films directed by Jonathan Demme
1974 LGBT-related films
Films scored by John Cale
American sexploitation films
Women in prison films
Films produced by Roger Corman
1974 directorial debut films
1974 drama films
1970s English-language films
1970s American films